The 2017 My Bariatric Solutions 300 was the sixth stock car race of the 2017 NASCAR Xfinity Series season and the 21st iteration of the event. The race was held on Saturday, April 8, 2017, in Fort Worth, Texas, at Texas Motor Speedway, a 1.5 miles (2.4 km) permanent tri-oval shaped racetrack. The race took the scheduled 200 laps to complete. At race's end, Erik Jones, driving for Joe Gibbs Racing, would dominate the race to win his seventh career NASCAR Xfinity Series win and his first of the season. To fill out the podium, Ryan Blaney of Team Penske and Kevin Harvick of Stewart-Haas Racing would finish second and third, respectively.

Background 

Texas Motor Speedway is a speedway located in the northernmost portion of the U.S. city of Fort Worth, Texas – the portion located in Denton County, Texas. The track measures 1.5 miles (2.4 km) around and is banked 24 degrees in the turns, and is of the oval design, where the front straightaway juts outward slightly. The track layout is similar to Atlanta Motor Speedway and Charlotte Motor Speedway (formerly Lowe's Motor Speedway). The track is owned by Speedway Motorsports, Inc., the same company that owns Atlanta and Charlotte Motor Speedway, as well as the short-track Bristol Motor Speedway.

Entry list 

 (R) denotes rookie driver.
 (i) denotes driver who is ineligible for series driver points.

*Withdrew.

Practice

First practice 
The first practice session was held on Friday, April 7, at 1:30 PM CST, and would last for one hour and 25 minutes.

Second and final practice 
The second and final practice session, sometimes referred to as Happy Hour, practice session was held on Friday, April 7, at 4:00 PM CST, and would last for 55 minutes.

Qualifying 
Qualifying was held on Saturday, April 8, at 9:35 AM CST. Since Texas Motor Speedway is under 2 miles (3.2 km), the qualifying system was a multi-car system that included three rounds. The first round was 15 minutes, where every driver would be able to set a lap within the 15 minutes. Then, the second round would consist of the fastest 24 cars in Round 1, and drivers would have 10 minutes to set a lap. Round 3 consisted of the fastest 12 drivers from Round 2, and the drivers would have 5 minutes to set a time. Whoever was fastest in Round 3 would win the pole.

Two drivers would fail to qualify: Stephen Leicht and Mike Harmon.

Full qualifying results

Race results 
Stage 1 Laps: 45

Stage 2 Laps: 45

Stage 3 Laps: 110

Standings after the race 

Drivers' Championship standings

Note: Only the first 12 positions are included for the driver standings.

References 

2017 NASCAR Xfinity Series
NASCAR races at Texas Motor Speedway
April 2017 sports events in the United States
2017 in sports in Texas